Charlie Kolb (14 May 1907 – 27 February 1994) was a former Australian rules footballer who played with Richmond in the Victorian Football League (VFL).

In 1933, Kolb was appointed as captain / coach of the Albury Rovers Football Club in the Albury & District Football League. He led them to the 1933 premiership and also won the association best and fairest medal, the Stavley Medal.

Notes

External links 

Albury & DFL Stavley Medalists

1907 births
1994 deaths
Australian rules footballers from New South Wales
Richmond Football Club players